The Royal Italian Army was the land force of the Kingdom of Italy, established with the proclamation of the Kingdom of Italy. During the 19th century Italy started to unify into one country, and in 1861 Manfredo Fanti signed a decree creating the Army of the Two Sicilies. This newly created army's first task was to defend against the repressive power in southern Italy. The Army of the Two Sicilies combated against criminals and other armies during this time of unification. After the monarchy ended in 1946, the army changed its name to become the modern Italian Army.

Within the Italian Royal Army are the elite mountain military corporals called, the Alpini. The Alpini are the oldest active mountain infantry in the world. Their original mission was to protect and secure Italy's northern mountain border that aligns with France and Austria. This group emerged in World War I when a three-year campaign was fought against the Austro-Hungarian Kaiserjager and the German Alpenkorps. Again in World War II the Alpini fought alongside Axis forces in the Eastern Front as well as the Balkans Campaigns.

History

Origins
The  dates from the proclamation of the Kingdom of Italy, following the unification of Italy in 1861 after most of the Papal States were seized. On 4 May 1861, Manfredo Fanti signed the creation decree, by which the new army was to replace the previous Royal Sardinian Army and the Army of the Two Sicilies.

The first two tasks of the new organization were the repression of brigandage in southern Italy against irregular and hit and run forces (mixed with bands of various criminals), who refused to accept the suppression of the Kingdom of Two Sicilies, and the Third War of Italian Independence. On 20 September 1870, the IV Corps captured Rome, which had remained under Papal control up until then.

On 8 February 1885, a corps of fewer than 1,000 soldiers landed at Massaua, Eritrea, starting the creation of an Italian colonial empire. The Italian advance of the First Italo-Ethiopian War was halted at the Battle of Adwa by overwhelming Ethiopian forces. The following year, as part of the Italian collaboration with the international pacification program after the revolt against the Turkish domination in Cyprus, another corps disembarked at Candia. On 14 July 1900, another expeditionary force was constituted to suppress the Boxer Rebellion in China in defense of the European protectorates.

On 3 October 1911, Italy invaded Libya as part of the Italo-Turkish War. The war against the Ottoman Empire ended with the signing of the First Treaty of Lausanne in Ouchy, near Lausanne, Switzerland.

Military Justice in the Royal Italian Army 
In the Italian Royal Army, military justice was applied on the based on the 1870 Military Penal Code regulations. This regulation structure was very similar to the 1859 version which was inspired by the Royal Sardinian Army penal code of 1840 which preceded the Albertine Statute of 1848. These regulations and factors were determined to be inadequate in the face of direct war violence. In total, 4,028 death sentences were passed in the Royal Italian Army whereas 2,967 were issued absentia where 750 were followed through and completed and 311 were not.

World War I 

The Royal Italian Army's first experience with modern warfare was in World War I, from 1915–1918. The war was fought mostly on the Italian Front in Northern Italy, costing the Italian Army serious casualties, including about 600,000 dead.

The Italian 35th Division served on the Macedonian Front as part of the Allied Army of the Orient.

Interwar period 

During the Interwar period, the army was initially focused on border security in the Alps and on the Italian-Yugoslav border. It supported Benito Mussolini's Fascist regime because of its expansionist ideology and reversal of previous governments' defense cuts. In the 1930s, the army participated in the final subjugation of Libya, participated in the invasion of Ethiopia, provided troops and materials for the Corps of Volunteer Troops to fight in the Spanish Civil War, and participated in the Italian invasion of Albania.

World War II

The  (Royal Army) was one of the largest ground forces in World War II, during which it was one of the pioneers of the use of paratroopers.  Many Italian divisions were reinforced by a MVSN  of two battalions due to the small size of the divisions.

Timeline 

 1861 – The  dates from the proclamation of the Kingdom of Italy, following the unification of Italy in 1861 after the Papal States were seized. On 4 May 1861, Manfredo Fanti signed the creation decree, by which the new army was to replace the previous Royal Sardinian Army and the Army of the Two Sicilies. The first two tasks of the new organization were the repression of brigandage in southern Italy against irregular and hit and run forces (mixed with bands of various criminals), who refused to accept the suppression of the Kingdom of Two Sicilies, and the Third War of Italian Independence.
 1870 – On 20 September the IV Corps capture Rome, which had remained under Papal control up until then.
 1885 – On 8 February fewer than 1,000 soldiers landed at Massaua, Eritrea, starting the creation of an Italian colonial empire. The Italian advance was halted at the Battle of Adwa by overwhelming Ethiopian forces. The following year, as part of the Italian collaboration with the international pacification program after the revolt against the Turkish domination in Cyprus, another corps disembarked at Candia.
 1900 – On 14 July another expeditionary force was constituted to suppress the Boxer Rebellion in China in defense of the European protectorates.
 1911 – On 3 October Italy invaded Libya as part of the Italo-Turkish War. The war against the Ottoman Empire ended with the signing of the First Treaty of Lausanne in Ouchy, near Lausanne, Switzerland. 
 1915–1918 – The Royal Italian Army's first experience with modern warfare was in World War I. The war was fought mostly on the Italian Front in Northern Italy, costing the Italian Army serious casualties, including about 600,000 dead.
 1918–1939 – During the Interwar period, the army participated in the final subjugation of Libya, participated in the invasion of Ethiopia, provided troops and materials for the Corps of Volunteer Troops to fight in the Spanish Civil War, and participated in the Italian invasion of Albania.
 1940 – The Italian Royal Army had 1,630,000 men divided into 73 separate divisions. Out of these 73, there are 59 infantry divisions, six Alpini divisions, three Celere divisions, three armored divisions plus numerous Frontier Guard and coastal sector. The main cause of the Italian army's suffering was due to inadequate equipment, weaponry and leadership. This deficiency ultimately led to numerous defeats in the year 1940.
 The  (Royal Army) was one of the largest ground forces in World War II, during which it was one of the pioneers of the use of paratroopers. Many Italian divisions were reinforced by a MVSN  of two battalions due to the small size of the divisions.

Main campaigns

19th century 
 Italian War of Independence (1866)
 Mahdist War (1881–1899)
 Italo-Ethiopian War (1895–1896)

20th century 
 Boxer Rebellion (1900)
 Italo-Turkish War (1911–1912)
 World War I (1915–1918)
 Pacification of Libya (1923–1932)
 Italo-Ethiopian War (1935–1936)
 Intervention in the Spanish Civil War (1936–1939)
 Italian invasion of Albania (1939)
 World War II (1940–1945)
 Regio Esercito (World War II)
 Italian Co-Belligerent Army (1943–1945)
 Esercito Nazionale Repubblicano

See also 
Italian Army
 Corpo Aeronautico Militare
List of Italian Army equipment in World War II
Regia Marina
Regia Aeronautica
Blackshirts
Esercito Nazionale Repubblicano

References

External links 
Regio Esercito

 
Military units and formations of Italy in World War I
Military units and formations of Italy in World War II
Italian Army